, known professionally as , is a Japanese actress, fashion model and singer from Kamikawa, Hyōgo Prefecture. She is best known for her lead roles on the NHK drama series Amachan (2013). In July 2016, it was announced that she changed her stage name to "のん, Non." She started releasing her own music in 2017 with her debut single "Ohirome Pack" and released her debut album called "Superhero's" in 2018.

Career
Nōnen debuted as a fashion model in 2006 and was selected as the eleventh image character for Calpis in 2012. In 2012 she was chosen in an audition of 1953 women to play the heroine in the 2013 NHK Asadora Amachan, in which she plays a high school girl who decides to become an ama, or female shell diver, as well as an idol. Amachan was a ratings success, earning an average 20.6% rating over the span of the series, second amongst Asadora only to Umechan Sensei (at 20.7%) in the last decade. Nōnen served as the "PR Ambassador" for the 2013 Kohaku Uta Gassen and was a featured performer on the show, singing and leading the band. She started releasing her music as a solo artist in 2017 with her debut single "Ohirome Pack" and released her debut album called "Superhero's" in 2018.

Appearances

Film

TV dramas

Anime television
Onihei (2017) as "Otaka"

Dubbing
The Lorax (2012) as "Audrey"
Marona's Fantastic Tale (2020) as "Marona"

Commercials
NTT DoCoMo - START! DoCoMo Campaign (2007-2008)
The Oriental Land Company - Tokyo Disney Resort Campus Day Passport (2011)
Calpis - Calpis Water (2012-2015)
A-net - Ne-net (2012)
Asahi Food & Healthcare - Natureve Kajitsu Dolce (2013)
Kosé
Company (2013)
Kosé Cosmeport - Softymo Natusabon (2014)
Canon - Mirrorless Camera Canon EOS M2 (2014)
Japan Post Insurance - Company (2014)
JX Holdings - ENEOS (2014)
Square Enix - Dragon Quest Monsters Superlight (2014)
Parco - Parco Gran-bazaar (2014)
Line Mobile (2017)

Bibliography

Magazines
Nicola, Shinchosha, 1997-, as an exclusive model (2006–2010)
Beautiful Lady & Television, Nounen Rena no Pop de Art na Uhihi. Style Guri-Guri-Gurumi, Tokyo News Service.

Photobooks
NHK Renzoku TV Shōsetsu Amachan Nounen Rena featuring Amano Aki (NHK Shuppan); 
Nounen Rena 1st Photobook Guri-Guri-Gurumi (Tokyo News Service)

Discography

Full-Length Albums
Superhero's (2018)

Singles and EPs

Ohirome Pack (2017)
スーパーヒーローになりたい (Superhero ni Naritai/I Want To Be A Superhero) (2017)
RUN!!! (2018)
わたしはベイベー (Watashi wa Baby/I am baby) (2018)
やまないギャル (Yamanai Girl) (2019)
Baby Face (2019) 
この町は (Kono Machi Ha) (2019)
わたしは部屋中 (Watashi wa Heyaju) (2019) 
クリスマスソング (Christmas Song) (2019) 
なまいきにスカート (Namaiki ni Skirt) (2020)

Awards
2006
10th Nicola model audition - Grand Prix
2012
37th Hochi Film Awards - Best New Artist for Karasu no Oyayubi
2013
6th Tokyo Drama Awards - Best Actress for Amachan
26th Shogakukan Dime Trend Award - The man in the news
78th Television Drama Academy Awards - Best Actress for Amachan
2014
38th Elan d'or Awards - Rookie of the Year
22nd Hashida Awards - Rookie Award for Amachan
17th Nikkan Sports Drama Grand Prix - Best Actress for Amachan
6th Tama Film Awards - Best Rising Actress for Hot Road
27th Nikkan Sports Film Award - Rookie of the Year
2015
38th Japan Academy Film Prize - Rookie of the Year (Hot Road)
31st Asakusa Entertainment Award - Best Newcomer
2016
38th Yokohama Film Festival - Special Jury Prize for In This Corner of the World
2017
31st Takasaki Film Festival - Horizont Award for In This Corner of the World
21st Japan Internet Movie Awards - Best Actress for In This Corner of the World
11th Seiyu Awards - Special Award

References

External links

Official website 
Nounen Rena TV appearance information 

1993 births
Living people
Actors from Hyōgo Prefecture
Japanese television actresses
Japanese female models
Japanese women singers
Asadora lead actors
Models from Hyōgo Prefecture
Japanese film actresses